Chukwudi Odiah (born 17 December 1983), commonly known as Chidi Odiah, is a Nigerian former professional footballer who played as a right-back.

Chidi Odiah has represented his country at international level. He has shown himself to be a skillful, attack minded fullback with a high work-rate.

Club career

Eagle Cement and Julius Berger
Odiah began his career with Eagle Cement in the Nigeria Premier League, before moving to Julius Berger F.C. in 2000 for which he has played 10 games. In this year Julius Berger F.C. won the Nigeria Premier League.

Sheriff Tiraspol
In late 2000 he moved to Sheriff Tiraspol. For the time spent in Tiraspol, Odiah appeared in 58 games adding five goals, becoming one of the major players in the team. Sheriff dominated Moldovan football and Chidi won many honors: Moldovan National Division – 2000–01, 2001–02, 2002–03, 2003–04; Moldovan Cup – 2000/01, 2001/02; Moldovan Super Cup – 2003 and CIS Cup – 2003. He also gained experience in the UEFA Champions League qualifying phase.

CSKA Moscow
In CIS Cup, he drew the attention of scouts CSKA and in 2004, Odiah joined CSKA Moscow on a four-year contract. Chidi was given the number 15 shirt. He made his debut for CSKA in the Russian Premier League against Rostov. He quickly took up position right back. Season 2005  was the best in his career, to date, Chukwudi won: Russian Premier League – 2005, Russian Cup – 2005, 2004–05 UEFA Cup (by beating Sporting Lisbon 3–1 in the Final on Estádio José Alvalade) and participated in the 2005 UEFA Super Cup. At quarter-finals 2004–05 UEFA Cup he scored the first goal in the 4–0 win over Auxerre. Last success in CSKA: quarter-finals 2009–10 UEFA Champions League and 2010–11 Russian Cup.

Odiah left CSKA Moscow by mutual consent on 16 February 2012.

International
Chidi has represented his nation at various youth levels. He played for Nigeria U-17 national team to African U-17 Championship – winner of the tournament. On the next event, Meridian Cup, he was team captain. 
His premier match in the senior team took place in September 2004, in a match against Zimbabwe. Chidi also twice won the bronze medal with Nigeria senior team at the African Cup of Nations – 2006, 2010.

Odiah was chosen for the team of Nigeria to 2010 FIFA World Cup and in the first match against Argentina came into the starting lineup, as well in the match with South Korea, he made goal assist.

Career statistics

Club

International

Score and result list Nigeria's goal tally first, score column indicates score after Odiah goal.

Honours

Clubs
Julius Berger
Nigeria Premier League: 2000

Sheriff Tiraspol
Moldovan National Division: 2000–01, 2001–02, 2002–03, 2003–04
Moldovan Cup: 2001, 2002
Moldovan Super Cup: 2003
CIS Cup: 2003

CSKA Moscow
UEFA Cup: 2005
Russian Premier League: 2005, 2006
Russian Cup: 2005, 2006, 2008, 2009, 2011
Russian Super Cup:  2004, 2006, 2007, 2009

International
Nigeria
African Cup of Nations Bronze medalist: 2006, 2010 

Nigeria under-17 team
African U-17 Championship: 2001

Individual
In the list of 33 best football players of the championship of Russia: position right half-backs № 1 (2005)
In the list of 33 best football players of the championship of Russia: position right full-backs № 2 (2004)

References

External links
 
 Odiah Profile at UEFA.com (2006/07)

1983 births
Living people
Sportspeople from Port Harcourt
Association football fullbacks
Nigerian footballers
Nigeria international footballers
2006 Africa Cup of Nations players
2010 Africa Cup of Nations players
Nigerian expatriate footballers
FC Sheriff Tiraspol players
PFC CSKA Moscow players
UEFA Cup winning players
Nigerian expatriate sportspeople in Moldova
Russian Premier League players
Expatriate footballers in Russia
Nigerian expatriate sportspeople in Russia
Expatriate footballers in Moldova
Dolphin F.C. (Nigeria) players
2010 FIFA World Cup players